Jan Jacobsen (fl. 1665–1667) was a mid-17th-century Flemish-born Dutch corsair and privateer. Operating out of France with other Dunkirkers such as Karel Verburg and Jan Jansen Gouverneur, he acted on behalf of England during the Second Anglo-Dutch War in the mid-1660s.

References

Dutch privateers
Dutch pirates
17th-century pirates
People of the Spanish Netherlands